Paul Smyth may refer to:

 Paul Smyth (poet) (1944–2006), American poet, writer, and teacher
 Paul Smyth (footballer) (born 1997), Northern Irish footballer, for Leyton Orient
 Paul Smyth (academic) (born 1947), professor of social policy
 Paul Cranfield Smyth (1888–1963), founder of the Finchley Art Society and artist

See also
 Paul Smith (disambiguation)